Political Analysis is a quarterly peer-reviewed academic journal of political science published quarterly by Cambridge University Press and the Society for Political Methodology. The journal puts emphasis on the quantitative work in political methodology. According to the Journal Citation Reports, the journal has a 2016 impact factor of 3.361, ranking it 5th out of 165 journals in the category "Political Science".

See also 
 List of political science journals

References

External links 
 

Political science journals
Quarterly journals
English-language journals
Publications established in 1990
Cambridge University Press academic journals